Dan Constantin Gogoşoiu (born 22 October 1990) is a Romanian footballer. He plays as a centre-forward.

References

External links
 

1990 births
Living people
Sportspeople from Craiova
Romanian footballers
Romania youth international footballers
Association football midfielders
Liga I players
Liga II players
FC U Craiova 1948 players
CSM Jiul Petroșani players
SCM Râmnicu Vâlcea players
Aarhus Fremad players
Brabrand IF players
Romanian expatriate footballers
Romanian expatriate sportspeople in Denmark
Expatriate men's footballers in Denmark